The 2012–13 Liga IV was the 71st season of the Liga IV, the fourth tier of the Romanian football league system. The champions of each county association play against one from a neighboring county in a play-off match played on a neutral venue. The winners of the play-off matches promoted to Liga III.

Promotion play-off
The matches was scheduled to be played on 19 June 2013.

|}

County leagues

Alba County

Arad County

Argeș County

Bacău County 

Relegation play-off 
The 17th-placed team of the Liga IV faces the 2nd placed team from Liga V Bacău. The match played on 30 June 2013.

|}

Bihor County

Bistrița-Năsăud County

Botoșani County 

Relegation play-off 
The 14th and 15th-placed teams of the Liga IV faces the 2nd placed teams from the two series of Liga V Botoșani.

Brașov County

Brăila County

Bucharest 
Seria 1

Seria 2

Championship play-off 
Group 1
All matches were played at Rocar Stadium in Bucharest on 24, 27 and 29 May 2013.

Group 2 
All matches were played at Romprim Stadium in Bucharest on 23, 25 and 28 May 2013.

Semi-finals 

Final 

Chitila won the 2012–13 Liga IV Bucharest and qualify to promotion play-off in Liga III.

Buzău County 
Series I

Series II

Series III

Championship play-off 
Quarter-finals

Semi-finals

Final
The championship final was played on 9 June 2013 at Gloria Stadium in Buzău.

Voința Lanurile won the 2012–13 Liga IV Buzău County and qualify to promotion play-off in Liga III.

Caraș-Severin County

Călărași County 

Relegation play-off 
The 13th and 14th-placed teams of the Liga IV faces the 2nd placed teams from the two series of Liga V Călărași.

Cluj County

Constanța County 
East Series

West Series

Championship play-off 
The teams started the play-off with all the records achieved in the regular season and played only against the teams from the other series.

Championship play-out 
The teams started the play-out with all the records achieved in the regular season and played only against the teams from the other series.

Covasna County

Dâmbovița County

Dolj County 

Championship play-off 
The results between the qualified teams was maintained in the championship play-off.

Galați County

Giurgiu County 

Championship play-off 
Nova Force Giurgiu and Avântul Florești did not pay their debts to AJF Giurgiu and, as a result, were not scheduled to play in the semifinals. In these conditions, the final played on 12 iunie 2013, at Orășenesc Stadium in Mihăilești, between Bolintin Malu Spart and Spicul Izvoru.
Final 

Bolintin Malu Spart won the 2012–13 Liga IV Giurgiu County and qualify to promotion play-off in Liga III.

Gorj County

Harghita County

Hunedoara County

Ialomița County

Iași County

Ilfov County 

Championship play-off 
Championship play-off played in a single round-robin tournament between the best four teams of the regular season. The teams started the play-off with the following points: 1st place – 3 points, 2nd place – 2 points, 3rd place – 1 point, 4th place – 0 points.

Maramureș County 
North Series

South Series

Championship final 
The championship final was played on 12 June 2013 at Viorel Mateianu Stadium in Baia Mare.

Baia Mare won the 2012–13 Liga IV Maramureș County and qualify to promotion play-off in Liga III.

Mehedinți County

Mureș County

Neamț County 

Championship play-off 
The championship play-off was played in a single round-robin tournament between the best four teams of the regular season. The teams started the play-off with the following points: 1st place – 3 points, 2nd place – 2 points, 3rd place – 1 point, 4th place – 0 points.

Olt County

Prahova County

Satu Mare County 
Seria A

 Seria B

Championship final 
The championship final was played on 8 June 2013 at Olimpia Stadium in Satu Mare.

Someșul Cărășeu won the 2012–13 Liga IV Satu Mare County and qualify to promotion play-off in Liga III.

Sălaj County

Sibiu County

Suceava County

Teleorman County

Timiș County

Tulcea County

Vaslui County 

Championship play-off

Vâlcea County 
North Series

 South Series

Championship play-off 
Semi-finals

Final

Hidroelectra Râmnicu Vâlcea won the 2012–13 Liga IV Vâlcea County and qualify to promotion play-off in Liga III.

Vrancea County 
North Series

South Series

Championship play-off 
The teams started the play-off with bonus points depending on the place occupied in the regular season : 1st place – 6 points, 2nd place – 4 points, 3rd place – 2 point, 4th place – 0 points.

Championship play-out 
The teams started the play-out with bonus points depending on the place occupied in the regular season : 5th place – 6 points, 6th place – 4 points, 7th place – 2 point, 8th place – 0 points.

See also 
 2012–13 Liga I
 2012–13 Liga II
 2012–13 Liga III

References

External links
 FRF

Liga IV seasons
4
Romania